Spodnji Log is a village in the Municipality of Kočevje in southern Slovenia. The area is part of the traditional region of Lower Carniola and is now included in the Southeast Slovenia Statistical Region.

The local church is dedicated to Saint Peter. It is an originally Gothic building that was refurbished in the Baroque style in 1708.

References

External links
Spodnji Log on Geopedia
Pre–World War II map of Spodnji Log with microtoponyms, oeconyms, and family names

Populated places in the Municipality of Kočevje